The Women's 1 m springboard competition of the 2022 European Aquatics Championships was held on 16 August 2022.

Results

The preliminary round was started at 12:00. The final was held at 15:10.

Green denotes finalists

References

Diving